Favartia norrisii is a species of sea snail, a marine gastropod mollusc in the family Muricidae, the murex snails or rock snails. It was first described by L.A. Reeve in 1845, under the name Murex norrisii (in honour of the naturalist Thomas Norris).

Description

Distribution

References

Muricidae
Gastropods described in 1845